Shlomi Azulay (born 18 October 1989) is an Israeli professional footballer who plays as a forward for Maccabi Bnei Reineh

Club career
Shlomi's first team was Liga Leumit side Hapoel Kfar Saba in the second division. He made his senior team debut for Hapoel Kfar Saba as a late 88th-minute substitute in a cup match against Beitar Jerusalem in February 2008.

On 30 October 2009, Kfar Saba played a Liga Leumit match against Beitar Shimshon Tel Aviv. At half time, the score was 0–0. Shlomi was sent into the match in the second half and scored twice to lead his team to a 2–0 win.

Azulay scored an important winning goal in the last game of the season on 14 May 2010 against Ironi Ramat HaSharon. Hapoel Kfar Saba defeated Ramat HaSharon 2–1 and secured the third place. Kfar Saba then went on to lose the promotion playoff match. Azulay ended the 2009–10 season with 15 goals to his name.

For the 2010–11 season, Azulay signed in Maccabi Haifa from the Israeli Premier League, in his debut game, he scored twice against Beitar Jerusalem after he had entered as a substitute in the 66th minute. A week later he scored yet again, this time against Bnei Sakhnin.
Azulay scored six goals and Assisted six in the championship season of Maccabi Haifa.

A year later he was loaned to Ironi Kiryat Shmona and took part in the surprising Championship of Kiryat Shmona and provided 8 goals and 5 assists.

After the historic championship with Irony Kiryat Shmona, Shlomi came back to Maccabi Haifa. In the 2012–13 season Shlomi plays either as a left winger or as a central striker during the season and provided 7 goals and 1 assist.

On 8 June 2019, he signed a two-year contract with Beitar Jerusalem.

Career statistics

Honours
 Israeli Premier League: 2010–11, 2011–12
 Israel State Cup runner-up: 2011
 Toto Cup: 2011–12, 2019–20

Individual
2015–16 Israeli Premier League second top scorer: 2015–16

References

External links

1989 births
Living people
Israeli footballers
Association football forwards
Ironi Tiberias F.C. players
Hapoel Kfar Saba F.C. players
Maccabi Haifa F.C. players
Hapoel Ironi Kiryat Shmona F.C. players
Beitar Jerusalem F.C. players
Hapoel Tel Aviv F.C. players
Bnei Sakhnin F.C. players
FC Astra Giurgiu players
Maccabi Bnei Reineh F.C. players
Liga Leumit players
Israeli Premier League players
Liga I players
Footballers from Tiberias
Israeli people of Moroccan-Jewish descent
Israeli expatriate footballers
Expatriate footballers in Romania
Israeli expatriate sportspeople in Romania